Ray Drew (born September 24, 1992) is an American football defensive end who has  played in the Canadian Football League (CFL) and the National Football League (NFL). He played college football at Georgia. Drew was signed by the Miami Dolphins as an undrafted free agent in 2015. He has also been a member of the Cleveland Browns, Green Bay Packers, and Carolina Panthers in the NFL, and the Montreal Alouettes in the CFL.

Early years
Drew attended Thomas County Central High School in Thomasville, Georgia. He was considered one of the best defensive line prospects in his class nicknamed the "Pastor Of Disaster". Drew also received a nomination to the 2010 U.S. Army All-American Bowl. Ray is an avid country music fan and spends his offseasons splitting time between Nashville, TN and Boston, GA.

College career
After his freshman and sophomore seasons, Drew became an integral part of Georgia's defense as a junior.

Professional career

Miami Dolphins
After going undrafted in the 2015 NFL Draft, Drew signed with the Miami Dolphins on May 8, 2015. He was released by the Dolphins on August 30, 2015.

Cleveland Browns
On October 6, 2015, Drew was signed to the Cleveland Browns' practice squad. He was released by the Browns on November 2, 2015.

Green Bay Packers
Drew was signed by the Green Bay Packers on March 14, 2016. On April 25, 2016, he was released by the Packers.

Carolina Panthers
On August 13, 2016, Drew was signed by the Carolina Panthers. He was released by the Panthers on August 28, 2016.

Montreal Alouettes
Drew has signed with the Montreal Alouettes of the Canadian Football League. He is playing defensive end and is wearing #95.

References

External links
 Carolina Panthers bio
 Cleveland Browns bio
 Georgia Bulldogs bio
 

1992 births
Living people
Players of American football from Georgia (U.S. state)
People from Thomasville, Georgia
American football defensive ends
American football defensive tackles
Canadian football defensive linemen
American players of Canadian football
Georgia Bulldogs football players
Miami Dolphins players
Cleveland Browns players
Green Bay Packers players
Carolina Panthers players
Montreal Alouettes players